Gabriele Boloca (born 31 March 2001) is a Romanian footballer who plays as a centre-back.

Club career 
A youth product of Juventus, Boloca was first called-up by Juventus U23 – the reserve team of Juventus – on 10 February 2019, for a match against Arzachena. Boloca was eventually called-up six times at the end of the season, without debuting. Boloca was sent on loan to the under-19 teams of Bologna and Monza, in the 2019–20 and 2020–21 seasons respectively. 

On 25 January 2020, Boloca was called-up by Siniša Mihajlović to Bologna's senior squad, for their game against SPAL; he was an unused substitute. In January 2021, Juventus announced Boloca's loan to Monza had been interrputed prematurely.

After being benched 21 times during the season, Boloca made his professional debut for Juventus U23 on 24 April 2022, as a starter in a Serie C game against Legnago Salus, helping his side win 3–2.

In 2022, he joined Serie D club Seregno.

International career 
In 2018, Boloca was called up to represent the Romania national under-17 team.

Personal life
He is the younger brother of Daniel Boloca who also plays football for Frosinone.

Style of play 
Boloca is a defender who mainly plays as a centre-back, and can also play as a left-back on occasion.

References

External links 
 
 

2001 births
Living people
People from Chieri
Footballers from Piedmont
Sportspeople from the Metropolitan City of Turin
Romanian footballers
Romania youth international footballers
Association football central defenders
Juventus Next Gen players
U.S. 1913 Seregno Calcio players
Serie C players
Serie D players